Emiel Rogiers (15 March 1923 – 5 December 1998) was a Belgian racing cyclist. He rode in the 1948 Tour de France.

References

External links

1923 births
1998 deaths
Belgian male cyclists
Sportspeople from Aalst, Belgium
Cyclists from East Flanders
20th-century Belgian people